Otto Witt (1875–1923) was a Swedish writer. He was one of the prominent figures in early Swedish science fiction. He did, among other things, publish Hugin, a science magazine which was filled "with speculative
articles and fiction". Hugin was one of the first magazines to regularly carry science fiction 
in the world, although it appears to have had little influence outside Sweden.

Notes

External links
 
 
 

1875 births
1923 deaths
Swedish science fiction writers
Swedish-language writers